Ivan Kapitonovich Luppol (Russian: Иван Капитонович Лу́ппол; (13) January 1896, Rostov-on-Don – 26 May 1943, Zubovo-Polyansky District) was a Soviet philosopher, literary critic and academician of the Academy of Sciences of the Soviet Union.

Biography 
Luppol attended the Faculty of Law of the Moscow University, graduating in 1919. In the same year he worked as a propagandist and political worker in the Red Army and in 1920 he became a member of the Russian Communist Party (b). He then studied at the Department of Philosophy of the Institute of Red Professors, being a member the Institute's first enrollment. His earlier works were about the philosophy of Denis Diderot.  

From 1924 he worked at the Marx-Engels Institute and became director of its philosophy cabinet.

Luppol was among the supporters of Abram Deborin in the philosophical debates. 

He was a professor at the Department of Historical Materialism at the Ethnological Faculty of Moscow State University from 1925 to 1931, as well as a professor at the department, and then head of the Department of Marxist-Leninist Philosophy of the Institute of Red Professors from 1925 to 1938.  

From 1929 to 1933 he headed the Glavnauka. Since 1934 he was Member of the Board of the Union of Soviet Writers. In 1935 he became a member of the directorate of the Institute of Russian Literature (Pushkin House). Director and one of the organizers of the Gorky Institute of World Literature (1935–1941). He was chief editor of the State Publishing House of Fiction. Elected a corresponding member of the USSR Academy of Sciences in the Department of Social Sciences in 1933 and an academician in the same department in 1939.   

Luppol was arrested in September 1940 and was held in the Saratov prison with Nikolai Vavilov. Initially he was sentenced to death but his sentence was later changed to twenty years of forced labor. He died in the Temlag camp in Mordovian ASSR in 1943. It is said prior to his death Luppol was to marry Nadezhda Peshkova, daughter of Maxim Gorky.     

Ivan Luppol was rehabilitated by the decision of the Military Collegium of the Supreme Court of the Soviet Union in 1956.

References

1896 births
1943 deaths
Institute of Red Professors alumni
Soviet philosophers
Full Members of the USSR Academy of Sciences
Russian historians of philosophy
People who died in the Gulag
Russian Marxists
Soviet rehabilitations